Keep an Eye on Summer – The Beach Boys Sessions 1964 is a compilation album of studio and live recordings by the Beach Boys, released on December 2, 2014 exclusively through the iTunes Store. It is a follow-up to the similar release The Big Beat 1963, composed of various selections related to Brian Wilson and the Beach Boys, released one year earlier.

Background

The compilation's release came as a result of revised European copyright laws, forcing some labels to publish unreleased archival material so that they will not lose their copyright. Keep an Eye on Summer is one of two such releases by Capitol Records in 2014, the other being Live in Sacramento 1964.

According to compilation producer Alan Boyd in the album's digital liner notes: "This new collection, made possible by the fact that the Beach Boys, starting in 1964, made a point of holding onto their work reels (and greatly enhanced by the recent recovery of some long lost tapes from the Shut Down Vol. 2 album sessions) shows the Beach Boys at their zenith, offering glimpses of the camaraderie, optimism and high spirits behind the creation of these timeless records, and highlighting the incredible vocal arrangements, compositional skills, and rapidly evolving production techniques that placed the Beach Boys and Brian Wilson at the forefront of pop music in 1964 and for all time."

Track listing

Personnel

Compilation staff
 Alan Boyd – producer
 Mark Linett – producer
 Monty Linett – associate producer
 Craig Slowinski – sessionography, research

References

2014 compilation albums
Albums produced by Brian Wilson
Albums produced by Mark Linett
The Beach Boys compilation albums
Capitol Records compilation albums
Compilation albums published posthumously
ITunes-exclusive releases
Copyright extension compilation albums